Daniel Goodwin may refer to:

Dan Goodwin (born 1955), American climber
Daniel Raynes Goodwin (1811–1890), American clergyman
Daniel Goodwin (Michigan judge) (1799–1887), Justice of the Michigan Supreme Court